A Diary in the Strict Sense of the Term is a collection of the private diaries of the prominent anthropologist Bronisław Malinowski during his fieldwork in New Guinea and the Trobriand Islands between 1914–1915 and 1917–1918. The diary is composed of two diaries, written in Polish.

Published posthumously by his widow Valetta Swann in 1967, the diaries, which repeatedly touches upon intensely personal matters such as sexual desires, as well as that of his private prejudices against his interlocutors, has remained extremely controversial. The introduction of the book was written by his pupil Raymond Firth.

History and significance 
When the diaries were published in 1967, Clifford Geertz called them "gross" and "tiresome", and wrote that they portrayed Malinowski as "a crabbed, self-preoccupied, hypochondriacal narcissist, whose fellow-feeling for the people he lived with was limited in the extreme." Two decades later, however, he praised the collection as a "backstage masterpiece of anthropology, our The Double Helix".

Michael W. Young noted that the diaries, "scandalously frank" with regards to topic such as the author's sexual desires and encounters, "debunked the romantic myth that he enjoyed relaxed and friendly rapport with his subjects and it fueled a moral crisis of the discipline in the 1970s." Some parts of the diaries have been described as "racist" and "abusive" towards the natives, although they have been also defended as reflecting his "a bit grouchy" attitude.  

In 1985, Malinowski's daughter, Helena Wayne, noted that the diaries were "very personal [and] not meant for other eyes", and that she would have preferred if they remained out of print, instead available only as raw materials for a biographer. She acknowledged, however, that many scholars found the diaries very useful for insights on Malinowski and his work.

Writing in 1987, James Clifford called the diaries "a crucial document for the history of anthropology".

In 2018, William W. Kelly wrote that "debate continues on whether the Diary directly reflects (and discredits) his fieldwork or whether it was an anguished outpouring of psychological anxieties that had more to do with his family, potential fiancées, and career than with anything going on outside his tent on the Trobriands".

References

External links
 - publisher's description

1967 non-fiction books
Anthropology books
Books by Bronisław Malinowski
Diaries
1970s controversies
Scientific controversies